Don Quixote is a 1923 British silent comedy film, directed by Maurice Elvey, based on the novel Don Quixote by Miguel de Cervantes. The film stars Jerrold Robertshaw, George Robey, Frank Arlton, and Marie Blanche.

Cast
Jerrold Robertshaw as Don Quixote
George Robey as Sancho Panza
Frank Arlton as Father Perez
Marie Blanche as The Housekeeper
Bertram Burleigh as Sanson Carrasc
Adeline Hayden Coffin as The Duchess
Sydney Fairbrother as Tereza
Minna Leslie as Dulcinea
Edward O'Neill as The Duke

References

External links

1923 films
British historical comedy films
British silent feature films
1920s historical comedy films
Films based on Don Quixote
Films directed by Maurice Elvey
British black-and-white films
1920s British films
Silent historical comedy films